The 1982 Chico State Wildcats football team represented California State University, Chico as a member of the Northern California Athletic Conference (NCAC) during the 1982 NCAA Division II football season. Led by ninth-year head coach Dick Trimmer, Chico State compiled an overall record of 5–5 with a mark of 1–4 in conference play, tying for fifth place in the NCAC. The team outscored its opponents 252 to 204 for the season. The Wildcats played home games at University Stadium in Chico, California.

Schedule

References

Chico State
Chico State Wildcats football seasons
Chico State Wildcats football